Jean-Marie Lehn (born 30 September 1939) is a French chemist. He received the Nobel Prize in Chemistry together with Donald Cram and Charles Pedersen in 1987 for his synthesis of cryptands. Lehn was an early innovator in the field of supramolecular chemistry, i.e., the chemistry of host–guest molecular assemblies created by intermolecular interactions, and continues to innovate in this field.  his group has published 790 peer-reviewed articles in chemistry literature.

Biography

Early years
Lehn was born in Rosheim, Alsace, France to Pierre and Marie Lehn. He is of Alsatian German descent. His father was a baker, but because of his interest in music, he later became the city organist. Lehn also studied music, saying that it became his major interest after science. He has continued to play the organ throughout his professional career as a scientist. His high school studies in Obernai, from 1950 to 1957, included Latin, Greek, German, and English languages, French literature, and he later became very keen of both philosophy and science, particularly chemistry. In July 1957, he obtained the baccalauréat in philosophy, and in September of the same year, the baccalauréat in Natural Sciences.

At the University of Strasbourg, although he considered studying philosophy, he ended up taking courses in physical, chemical and natural sciences, attending the lectures of Guy Ourisson, and realizing that he wanted to pursue a research career in organic chemistry.  He joined Ourisson's lab, working his way to the Ph.D. There, he was in charge of the lab's first NMR spectrometer, and published his first scientific paper, which pointed out an additivity rule for substituent induced shifts of proton NMR signals in steroid derivatives. He obtained his Ph.D., and went to work for a year at Robert Burns Woodward's laboratory at Harvard University, working among other things on the synthesis of vitamin B12.

Career 
In 1966, he was appointed a position as maître de conférences (assistant professor) at the Chemistry Department of the University of Strasbourg. His research focused on the physical properties of molecules, synthesizing compounds specifically designed for exhibiting a given property, in order to better understand how that property was related to structure.

In 1968, he achieved the synthesis of cage-like molecules, comprising a cavity inside which another molecule could be lodged. Organic chemistry enabled him to engineer cages with the desired shape, thus only allowing a certain type of molecule to lodge itself in the cage. This was the premise for an entire new field in chemistry, sensors. Such mechanisms also play a great role in molecular biology.

These cryptands, as Lehn dubbed them, became his main center of interest, and led to his definition of a new type of chemistry, "supramolecular chemistry", which instead of studying the bonds inside one molecule, looks at intermolecular attractions, and what would be later called "fragile objects", such as micelles, polymers, or clays.

In 1980, he was elected to become a teacher at the prestigious Collège de France, and in 1987 was awarded the Nobel Prize, alongside Donald Cram and Charles Pedersen for his works on cryptands.

He is currently a member of the Reliance Innovation Council which was formed by Reliance Industries Limited, India.

, Lehn has an h-index of 154 according to Google Scholar and of 137 (946 documents) according to Scopus.

Legacy
In 1987, Pierre Boulez dedicated a very short piano work Fragment d‘une ébauche to Lehn on the occasion of his Nobel Prize in Chemistry.

Personal life
Lehn was married in 1965 to Sylvie Lederer, and together they had two sons, David and Mathias.

Lehn is an atheist.

Honors and awards
Lehn has won numerous awards and honors including:

French awards and decorations
 CNRS Gold medal (1981; Silver Medal: 1972; Bronze Medal: 1963)
 Knight of the Ordre des Palmes académiques (1989)
 Officer of the Ordre national du Mérite (1993; Knight: 1976)
 Grand Officer of the Légion d'Honneur (2014; Commander: 1996; Officer: 1988; Knight: 1983)

Other international and national awards
Elected an International Member of the United States National Academy of Sciences (1980)
 Elected a Member of the American Academy of Arts and Sciences (1980)
 Humboldt Prize (1983)
 Elected a Foreign Member of the Royal Netherlands Academy of Arts and Sciences (1983)
 Nobel Prize in Chemistry (1987)
 Elected a Member of the American Philosophical Society (1987)
 Pour le Mérite (1990)
 Elected a Foreign Member of the Royal Society (ForMemRS) in 1993
 The Davy Medal of the Royal Society (1997)
 Austrian Cross of Honour for Science and Art, 1st class (2001)
 Grand Officer of the Order of Cultural Merit of Romania (2004)
 Gutenberg Lecture Award (2006)
 ISA Medal for Science (2006)
 Knight Commander's Cross of the Order of Merit of the Federal Republic of Germany (2009)
Order of the Rising Sun (Gold and Silver Star) of Japan (2019)

Honorary degrees
Lehn received numerous Honorary Doctorates (25), from:

 Hebrew University of Jerusalem, 1984
 Autonomous University of Madrid, 1985
 Georg-August University of Göttingen, 1987
 Université Libre de Bruxelles, 1987
 University of Crete (Iraklion University), 1989
 Università degli Studi di Bologna, 1989
 Charles University of Prague, 1990
 University of Sheffield, 1991
 University of Twente, 1991
 University of Athens, 1992
 National Technical University of Athens (Polytechnical University of Athens), 1992
 Illinois Wesleyan University, 1995
 Université de Montréal, 1995
 University of Bielefeld, 1998
 Honorary Professor, University of Science and Technology of China, Hefei, 1998
 Honorary Professor, Southeast University, Nanjing, 1998
 Weizmann Institute of Science, Rehovot, 1998
 Faculté des Sciences Appliquées, Université Libre de Bruxelles, 1999
 Nagoya University, 2000
 Université de Sherbrooke, 2000
 Università di Trieste, 2001
 Honorary Professor, Shanghai Jiao Tong University, 2003
 Honorary Professor, Nanjing University, 2003
 Royal Institute of Technology, Stockholm, 2003
 University of St. Andrews, 2004
 Heriot Watt University, Edinburgh, 2005
 Peter the Great St. Petersburg Polytechnic University (Technical University, St Petersburg), 2005
 Masaryk University, Brno, 2005
 Honorary Professor, Beijing University, 2005
 Kyushu University, 2005
 Moscow State University, 2006
 Aristotle University of Thessaloniki, 2006
 Kazan Federal University, 2006
 Novosibirsk State University, 2006
 Honorary Professor, Zhejiang University, Hangzhou, 2007
 Honorary Professor, Shaanxi Normal University, Xi’an, 2007
 Special Honorary Professorship, Osaka Prefecture University, Sakai, 2008
 University of Patras, 2008
 Babeș-Bolyai University, Cluj-Napoca, 2008
 University of Basilicata, Potenza, 2008
 Taras Shevchenko National University of Kyiv, 2009
 Technion – Israel Institute of Technology, 2009
 University of Ljubljana, 2009
 City University of Hong Kong, 2010
 Queen's University Belfast, 2012
 Honorary Professor, Novosibirsk State University, 2012
 Honorary Professor, Xiamen University, 2012
 Honorary Professor, Jilin University, 2013
 Honorary Professor, Shanxi University, 2013
 University of Oxford, 2014
 Macau University of Science and Technology (MUST), 2015
 University of Málaga, 2015
 Honorary Professor, Kyushu University, 2016
 Honorary Professor, China Pharmaceutical University, 2016
 Honorary Professor, Wuhan University of Technology, 2016
 Institute of Chemical Technology, Mumbai, 2017
 University of Cambridge, 2017
 New York University, 2017
 University of Bucharest, 2018
 University of Vienna, 2019
 University of Chemistry and Technology, Prague, 2019

Books

References

Further reading
 
  continued on page 56

External links

  including the Nobel lecture, 8 December 1987 Supramolecular Chemistry – Scope and Perspectives Molecules – Supermolecules – Molecular Devices

1939 births
Living people
People from Rosheim
French people of German descent
Academic staff of the Collège de France
French atheists
20th-century French chemists
21st-century French chemists
French Nobel laureates
Harvard University staff
Members of the French Academy of Sciences
Members of the Royal Netherlands Academy of Arts and Sciences
Foreign associates of the National Academy of Sciences
Members of the Pontifical Academy of Sciences
Foreign Members of the Royal Society
Foreign Members of the Russian Academy of Sciences
Foreign members of the Chinese Academy of Sciences
Nobel laureates in Chemistry
Academic staff of the University of Strasbourg
Grand Officiers of the Légion d'honneur
Chevaliers of the Ordre des Palmes Académiques
Officers of the Ordre national du Mérite
Recipients of the Austrian Cross of Honour for Science and Art, 1st class
Knights Commander of the Order of Merit of the Federal Republic of Germany
Recipients of the Pour le Mérite (civil class)
Articles containing video clips
Members of the American Philosophical Society
Members of the Göttingen Academy of Sciences and Humanities